The Arno was an English automobile manufactured in Coventry only in 1908; the car, which featured a 25hp White and Poppe engine and shaft drive, was introduced at that year's Stanley Show.

See also
 List of car manufacturers of the United Kingdom

Defunct motor vehicle manufacturers of England
Coventry motor companies
Cars introduced in 1908
Brass Era vehicles
1908 in England